Kleber Emilson Fajardo Barzola (born 4 January 1965) is an Ecuadorian former footballer who played as a defender. He made 35 appearances for the Ecuador national team from 1987 to 1994. He was also part of Ecuador's squad for the 1987 Copa América tournament.

References

External links
 

1965 births
Living people
Ecuadorian footballers
Association football defenders
Ecuador international footballers
C.S. Emelec footballers
C.D. Olmedo footballers
Guayaquil City F.C. managers